Pihlaspea is a village in Haljala Parish, Lääne-Viru County, in northern Estonia.

A cemetery is located in the village. Historically it was next to a chapel which was built in 1673 but demolished in 1845.

References

 

Villages in Lääne-Viru County